Clonidine, sold under the brand name Catapres among others, is an α2-adrenergic agonist medication used to treat high blood pressure, ADHD, drug withdrawal (alcohol, opioids, or nicotine), menopausal flushing, diarrhea, spasticity, and certain pain conditions. It is used by mouth, by injection, or as a skin patch. Onset of action is typically within an hour with the effects on blood pressure lasting for up to eight hours.

Common side effect include dry mouth, dizziness, headaches, hypotension, and sleepiness. Severe side effects may include hallucinations, heart arrhythmias, and confusion. If rapidly stopped, withdrawal effects may occur. Use during pregnancy or breastfeeding is not recommended. Clonidine lowers blood pressure by stimulating α2 receptors in the brain, which results in relaxation of many arteries.

Clonidine was patented in 1961 and came into medical use in 1966. It is available as a generic medication. In 2020, it was the 75th most commonly prescribed medication in the United States, with more than 9million prescriptions.

Medical uses

Clonidine is used to treat high blood pressure, attention deficit hyperactivity disorder (ADHD), drug withdrawal (alcohol, opioids, or smoking), menopausal flushing, diarrhea, and certain pain conditions. It also sees some use off-label for episodic insomnia, restless-legs syndrome, and anxiety, among other uses.

Resistant hypertension
Clonidine may be effective for lowering blood pressure in people with resistant hypertension.

Clonidine works by slowing the pulse rate and exerts a reduction of serum concentrations of renin, aldosterone, and catecholamines.

Attention deficit hyperactivity disorder
Clonidine may improve symptoms of attention deficit hyperactivity disorder in some people but causes many adverse effects and the beneficial effect is modest. In Australia, clonidine is an accepted but not approved use for ADHD by the TGA. Clonidine, along with methylphenidate, has been studied for treatment of ADHD. While not as effective as methylphenidate in treating ADHD, clonidine does offer some benefit; it can also be useful in combination with stimulant medications. Some studies show clonidine to be more sedating than guanfacine, which may be better at bedtime along with an arousing stimulant in the morning. Clonidine has been used to reduce sleep disturbances in ADHD, including to help offset stimulant-associated insomnia.

Drug withdrawal
Clonidine may be used to ease drug withdrawal symptoms associated with abruptly stopping the long-term use of opioids, alcohol, benzodiazepines and nicotine. It can alleviate opioid withdrawal symptoms by reducing the sympathetic nervous system response such as tachycardia and hypertension, hyperhidrosis (excessive sweating), hot and cold flashes, and akathisia. It may also be helpful in aiding smokers to quit. The sedation effect can also be useful. Clonidine may also reduce severity of neonatal abstinence syndrome in infants born to mothers that are using certain drugs, particularly opioids. In infants with neonatal withdrawal syndrome, clonidine may improve the neonatal intensive care unit Network Neurobehavioral Score.

Clonidine has also been suggested as a treatment for rare instances of dexmedetomidine withdrawal.

Spasticity 
Clonidine has some role in the treatment of spasticity, acting principally by inhibiting excessive sensory transmission below the level of injury. Its use, however, is mainly as a second or third line agent, due to side effects such as hypotension, bradycardia, and drowsiness.

Other uses
Clonidine also has several off-label uses, and has been prescribed to treat psychiatric disorders including stress, sleep disorders,  hyperarousal caused by post-traumatic stress disorder, borderline personality disorder, and other anxiety disorders. Clonidine is also a mild sedative, and can be used as premedication before surgery or procedures. It has also been studied as a way to calm acute manic episodes. Its epidural use for pain during heart attack, and postoperative and intractable pain has also been studied extensively. Clonidine can be used in restless legs syndrome. It can also be used to treat facial flushing and redness associated with rosacea. It has also been successfully used topically in a clinical trial as a treatment for diabetic neuropathy. Clonidine can also be used for migraine headaches and hot flashes associated with menopause. Clonidine has also been used to treat refractory diarrhea associated with irritable bowel syndrome, fecal incontinence, diabetes, diarrhea associated with opioid withdrawal, intestinal failure, neuroendocrine tumors, and cholera. Clonidine can be used in the treatment of Tourette syndrome (specifically for tics). Clonidine has also had some success in clinical trials for helping to remove or ameliorate the symptoms of hallucinogen persisting perception disorder (HPPD). 

Injection of α2 receptor agonists into the knee joint space, including clonidine, may reduce the severity of knee pain after arthroscopic knee surgery.

Light-activated derivatives of clonidine (adrenoswitches) have been developed for research purposes and shown to control pupillary reflex with light in blind mice by topical application.

Clonidine suppression test
The reduction in circulating norepinephrine by clonidine was used in the past as an investigatory test for phaeochromocytoma, which is a catecholamine-synthesizing tumor, usually found in the adrenal medulla. In a clonidine suppression test, plasma catecholamine levels are measured before and 3 hours after a 0.3 mg oral test dose has been given to the patient. A positive test occurs if there is no decrease in plasma levels.

Pregnancy and breastfeeding
Clonidine is classed by the FDA as pregnancy category C. It is classified by the TGA of Australia as pregnancy category B3, which means that it has shown some detrimental effects on fetal development in animal studies, although the relevance of this to human beings is unknown. Clonidine appears in high concentration in breast milk and nursing infants have approximately 2/3 of serum clonidine concentrations as the mother. Caution is warranted in women who are pregnant, planning to become pregnant, or are breastfeeding.

Adverse effects
The principal adverse effects of clonidine are sedation, dry mouth, and hypotension (low blood pressure).

By frequency

Very common (>10% frequency):

 Dizziness
 Orthostatic hypotension
 Somnolence (dose-dependent)
 Dry mouth
 Headache (dose-dependent)
 Fatigue
 Skin reactions (if given transdermally)
 Hypotension

Common (1-10% frequency):

 Anxiety
 Constipation
 Sedation (dose-dependent)
 Nausea/vomiting
 Malaise
 Abnormal LFTs
 Rash
 Weight gain/loss
 Pain below the ear (from salivary gland)
 Erectile dysfunction

Uncommon (0.1-1% frequency):

 Delusional perception
 Hallucination
 Nightmare 
 Paresthesia
 Sinus bradycardia
 Raynaud's phenomenon
 Pruritus
 Urticaria

Rare (<0.1% frequency):

 Gynaecomastia
 Impaired ability to cry
 Atrioventricular block
 Nasal dryness
 Colonic pseudo-obstruction 
 Alopecia
 Hyperglycemia

Withdrawal
Because clonidine suppresses sympathetic outflow, resulting in lower blood pressure, sudden discontinuation can result in acute hypertension due to a rebound in sympathetic outflow. In extreme cases, this can result in a hypertensive crisis, which is a medical emergency.

Clonidine therapy should generally be gradually tapered when discontinuing therapy to avoid rebound effects from occurring. Treatment of clonidine withdrawal hypertension depends on the severity of the condition. Reintroduction of clonidine for mild cases, alpha and beta blockers for more urgent situations. Beta blockers never should be used alone to treat clonidine withdrawal as alpha vasoconstriction would still continue.

Pharmacology

Mechanism of action
Clonidine crosses the blood–brain barrier.

High blood pressure
Clonidine treats high blood pressure by stimulating α2 receptors in the brainstem, which decreases peripheral vascular resistance, lowering blood pressure. It has specificity towards the presynaptic α2 receptors in the vasomotor center in the brainstem. This binding has a sympatholytic effect, suppresses release of norepinephrine, ATP, renin, and neuropeptide Y which if released would increase vascular resistance.

Clonidine also acts as an agonist at imidazoline-1 (I1) receptors in the brain, and it is hypothesized that this effect may contribute to reducing blood pressure by reducing signaling in the sympathetic nervous system; this effect acts upstream of the central α2 agonist effect of clonidine.

Clonidine may also cause bradycardia, theoretically by increasing signaling through the vagus nerve. When given intravenously, clonidine can temporarily increase blood pressure by stimulating α1 receptors in smooth muscles in blood vessels. This hypertensive effect is not usual when clonidine is given by mouth or by the transdermal route.

Plasma concentration of clonidine exceeding 2.0 ng/mL does not provide further blood pressure reduction.

Attention deficit hyperactivity disorder 

In the setting of attention deficit hyperactivity disorder (ADHD), clonidine's molecular mechanism of action occurs due to its agonism at the alpha-2A adrenergic receptor, the subtype of the adrenergic receptor that is most principally found in the brain. Within the brain, the alpha-2A adrenergic receptors are found within the prefrontal cortex (PFC), among other areas. The alpha-2A adrenergic receptors are found on the presynaptic cleft of a given neuron, and, when activated by an agonist, the effect on downstream neurons is inhibitory. The inhibition is accomplished by preventing the secretion of the neurotransmitter norepinephrine. Thus, clonidine's agonism on alpha-2A adrenergic receptors in the PFC inhibits the action of downstream neurons by preventing the secretion of norepinephrine.

This mechanism is similar to the brain's physiological inhibition of PFC neurons by the locus ceruleus (LC), which secretes norepinephrine into the PFC. Although norepinephrine can also bind to target adrenergic receptors on the downstream neuron (otherwise inducing a stimulatory effect), norepinephrine also binds to alpha-2A adrenergic receptors (akin to clonidine's mechanism of action), inhibiting the release of norepinephrine by that neuron and inducing an inhibitory effect. Because the PFC is required for working memory and attention, it is thought that clonidine's inhibition of PFC neurons helps to eliminate irrelevant attention (and subsequent behaviors), improving the person's focus and correcting deficits in attention.

Growth hormone test
Clonidine stimulates release of GHRH hormone from the hypothalamus, which in turn stimulates pituitary release of growth hormone. This effect has been used as part of a "growth hormone test," which can assist with diagnosing growth hormone deficiency in children.

Pharmacokinetics
After being ingested, clonidine is absorbed into the blood stream rapidly with an overall bioavailability around 70 - 80%. Peak concentrations in human plasma occur within 60–90 minutes for the "Immediate Release" (IR) version of the drug, which is shorter than the "Extended Release" (ER/XR) version. Clonidine is fairly lipid soluble with the logarithm of its partition coefficient (log P) equal to 1.6; to compare, the optimal log P to allow a drug that is active in the human central nervous system to penetrate the blood brain barrier is 2.0. Less than half of the absorbed portion of an orally administered dose will be metabolized by the liver into inactive metabolites, with roughly the other half being excreted unchanged by the kidneys. About one-fifth of an oral dose will not be absorbed, and is thus excreted in the feces. Work with liver microsomes shows in the liver clonidine is primarily metabolized by CYP2D6 (66%), CYP1A2 (10-20%), and CYP3A (0-20%) with negligible contributions from the less abundant enzymes CYP3A5, CYP1A1, and CYP3A4. 4-hydroxyclonidine, the main metabolite of clonidine, is also an alpha-2A agonist but is non lipophilic and is not believed to contribute to the effects of clonidine since it does not cross the blood–brain barrier.

Measurements of the half-life of clonidine vary widely, between 6 and 23 hours, with the half-life being greatly affected by and prolonged in the setting of poor kidney function. Variations in half-life may be partially attributable to CYP2D6 genetics. Some research has suggested the half-life of clonidine is dose dependent and approximately doubles upon chronic dosing, while other work contradicts this. Following a 0.3 mg oral dose, a small study of five patients by Dollery et al (1976) found half-lives ranging between 6.3 - 23.4 hours (mean 12.7). A similar N=5 study by Davies et al. (1977) found a narrower range of half-lives, between 6.7 - 13 hours (average 8.6 hours), while an N=8 study by Keraäen et al. that included younger patients found a somewhat shorter average half-life of 7.5 hours.

History
Clonidine was introduced in 1966. It was first used as a hypertension treatment under the trade name of Catapres.

Society and culture

Brand names
As of June 2017, clonidine was marketed under many brand names worldwide: Arkamin, Aruclonin, Atensina, Catapin, Catapres, Catapresan, Catapressan, Chianda, Chlofazoline, Chlophazolin, Clonid-Ophtal, Clonidin, Clonidina, Clonidinã, Clonidine, Clonidine hydrochloride, Clonidinhydrochlorid, Clonidini, Clonidinum, Clonigen, Clonistada, Clonnirit, Clophelinum, Dixarit, Duraclon, Edolglau, Haemiton, Hypodine, Hypolax, Iporel, Isoglaucon, Jenloga, Kapvay, Klofelino, Kochaniin, Lonid, Melzin, Menograine, Normopresan, Paracefan, Pinsanidine, Run Rui, and Winpress. It was marketed as a combination drug with chlortalidone as Arkamin-H, Bemplas, Catapres-DIU, and Clorpres, and in combination with bendroflumethiazide as Pertenso.

See also 
 Ajmalicine
 Serpentine

References

External links 

 
 Alpha-2 agonists in ADHD

Alpha-2 adrenergic receptor agonists
Anilines
Antihypertensive agents
Antimigraine drugs
Anxiety disorder treatment
Anxiolytics
Appetite stimulants
Attention deficit hyperactivity disorder management
Boehringer Ingelheim
Chlorobenzenes
Imidazolines
Guanidines
Novartis brands
Wikipedia medicine articles ready to translate
Ophthalmology drugs